The 2021 Dhaka Premier Division Twenty20 Cricket League was the second edition of the Dhaka Premier Division Twenty20 Cricket League, a Twenty20 cricket competition that was held in Bangladesh. The tournament replaced the 2019–20 Dhaka Premier Division Cricket League, which was postponed due to the COVID-19 pandemic, and featured the same twelve teams playing in the Twenty20 format instead of the List A format.

Originally, the tournament was scheduled to start on 6 May 2021. However, in April 2021, the tournament was postponed until 31 May 2021, due to the nationwide lockdown. In May 2021, the Bangladesh Cricket Board (BCB) announced that the tournament would be used as the preparation for the 2021 ICC Men's T20 World Cup, and the home series against Australia, England and New Zealand. All the matches of the tournament were broadcast on the BCB's official YouTube channel. All the matches of the second round of the league were abandoned and all the remaining matches were moved forward by one day due to rain. On 4 June 2021, BCB announced the revised fixtures from fourth to seventh round. On 17 June 2021, the dates of Super League fixture were announced, where top six teams of Group stage points table were advanced to the next round.

Abahani Limited won the tournament after finishing top of the Super League phase of the competition. Meanwhile, Old DOHS Sports Club and Partex Sporting Club were both relegated, after finishing in the bottom two places of the Relegation League, with Legends of Rupganj retaining their place in the Premier Division.

Teams
The following teams played in the tournament:

 Abahani Limited
 Brothers Union
 Gazi Group Cricketers
 Khelaghar Samaj Kallyan Samity
 Legends of Rupganj
 Mohammedan Sporting Club
 Old DOHS Sports Club
 Partex Sporting Club
 Prime Bank Cricket Club
 Prime Doleshwar Sporting Club
 Sheikh Jamal Dhanmondi Club
 Shinepukur Cricket Club

Points tables

Group stage

 Teams qualified for the Super League phase of the tournament.

 Teams qualified for the Relegation League play-offs phase of the tournament.

Super League

 Champions

Relegation League

 Teams relegated to the Dhaka First Division Cricket League.

Fixtures

Round robin

Round 1

Round 2

Round 3

Round 4

Round 5

Round 6

Round 7

Round 8

Round 9

Round 10

Round 11

Super League

Relegation League

References

External links
 Series home at ESPN Cricinfo

2021 T20
Dhaka Premier Division Twenty20 Cricket League
2021 in Bangladeshi cricket
Bangladeshi cricket seasons from 2000–01